Vuelo is the debut studio album by Chilean pop vocal group Kudai, released on July 10, 2004 in Chile and two years later in Mexico and the rest of Latin America. After finishing their project as a children's band CIAO, Pablo Holman, Bárbara Sepúlveda, Nicole Natalino and Tomas Manzi, began to prepare a new stage as a teenage band with the help of their manager, Pablo Vega, and composer Gustavo Pinochet. Thus was conceived Kudai, which derives from the Mapudungun word "kudau" (native Chilean language), which according to the band members means "young worker". 

The album contains 13 tracks, of which most of the lyrics are about problems related to adolescence such as depression, the illusion of first love and breakups.

Track listing
"Escapar" (Escape) (Guz) — 4:44
"Sin Despertar" (Without Waking Up) (Guz) — 3:16
"Ya Nada Queda" (There's Nothing Left) (Guz) — 3:41
"No Quiero Regresar" (I Don't Want To Return) (Guz, Juan José Arranguiz) — 3:08
"Más" (More) (Guz) — 3:18
"Que Aquí Que Allá" (That Here That There) (Guz) — 3:43
"Quiero" (I Want) (Guz) — 3:25
"Lejos De La Ciudad" (Far From The City) (Guz, Dr. Alfa) — 4:03
"Vuelo" (Flight) (Guz, Dr. Alfa, Mai) — 3:07
"Dulce Y Violento" (Sweet & Violent) (Guz) — 3:25
"Sin Despertar (Versión Acústica)" (Without Waking Up (Acoustic Version)) (Guz) — 3:51
"Escapar (Versión Acústica)" (Escape (Acoustic Version)) (Guz) — 2:57
"Algo De Más" (Something Else) (Guz) — 3:12

Chart

Weekly charts

Year-end charts

Certifications and sales

Release history

References

2004 debut albums
Kudai albums